Leslie Robert Lawrenson (July 25, 1902 - 1978) was Dean of Derry  from 1946 until 1967.

Life
Born in 1902, he was educated at Trinity College, Dublin and ordained in 1926. Hayes was a curate at Derry Cathedral, the rector of Donegal from 1930 to 1938 and then of Conwal and Leck  until his appointment to the deanery.

References

1902 births
Alumni of Trinity College Dublin
20th-century Irish Anglican priests
Deans of Derry
1978 deaths